Lana Waleed Issa Feras (born 1 June 1998) is a Jordanian footballer who plays as a defender for local Women's League club Shabab Al-Ordon and the Jordan women's national team.

References 

1998 births
Living people
Jordanian women's footballers
Jordan women's international footballers
Women's association football defenders
Sportspeople from Amman
Jordan Women's Football League players
21st-century Jordanian women